Hoseynabad-e Zelleh Jub (also Romanized as Ḩoseynābād-e Z̧elleh Jūb and Ḩoseynābād-e Zeleh Jūb; also known as Ḩoseynābād-e Zeleh Jū) is a village in Chaharduli-ye Gharbi Rural District, Chaharduli District, Qorveh County, Kurdistan Province, Iran. At the 2006 census, its population was 155, in 32 families. The village is populated by Kurds.

References 

Towns and villages in Qorveh County
Kurdish settlements in Kurdistan Province